Borisovo is a rural locality (a settlement) and the administrative center of Borisovskoye Rural Settlement, Chagodoshchensky District, Vologda Oblast, Russia. The population was 515 as of 2002. There are 6 streets.

Geography 
Malashkino is the nearest rural locality.

References 

Rural localities in Chagodoshchensky District